Michael Long  (born 1 October 1969) is a former Australian rules footballer of Aboriginal descent who became a spokesperson for Indigenous rights and against racism in sport.

Long was an accomplished player, having played in dual Australian Football League premierships with the Essendon Football Club including a Norm Smith Medal for his 1993 performance.

As an activist, he is credited with being instrumental in the introduction of a racial vilification code in the AFL in 1995 and the inspiration behind "The Long Walk" commemorating the Stolen Generation, now a strong AFL tradition.

Early life
Long was born to mother Agnes and Jack Long. Both been removed from her parents at a young age and taken to the Melville Island, one of the Tiwi Islands. Agnes was taken from Daly River near Darwin and Jack was taken from Ti Tree near Alice Springs. Michael Long was raised on the Tiwi Islands before moving to Darwin to play with St Mary's where he played in multiple premierships. In 1988 he represented the Northern Territory at the 1988 Adelaide Bicentennial Carnival in March 1988 and his outstanding performances in the dominant NT saw enormous interest in his recruitment from clubs throughout the country including VFL club Essendon which nominated him in the National Draft.

Early career
Despite being drafted to the VFL, West Torrens argued that Long was "contracted with the club and could not play anywhere else."

Noel Judkins said, "I was guaranteed this wasn't the case, so I took the contract to Darwin and met with Michael's father Jack and he was irate. He grabbed it and wrote the word 'bullshit' right across the front of it. When it became clear he wanted to play at Essendon, West Torrens agreed it wasn't a binding contract."

However, despite this, Long did play for West Torrens during the 1988 SANFL season, winning the club's best-and-fairest award, the third-last player to do so, as the Eagles merged with the Woodville Football Club following the 1990 season to become the Woodville-West Torrens Eagles.

Australian Football League career
Long played perhaps the best game of his career in the 1993 AFL Grand Final. Playing on Mark Athorn, Long ran amok, helping Essendon gain a healthy quarter-time lead and to maintain it. By the end of the game, he had amassed 20 kicks and 13 handballs, totalling 33 possessions.

Long's performance was rewarded with the Norm Smith Medal, which was presented to him by fellow Tiwi Islander Maurice Rioli.

In the pre-season of 1994 in a practice match against the West Coast Eagles, Long injured his knee, which required 12 months of solid rehabilitation, and he was not seen for the entire 1994 AFL home-and-away season.

In 1995, Long made a triumphant return to AFL football and played almost a full season. In the Anzac Day match between Essendon and Collingwood at the MCG, Long claimed to have been racially taunted by Collingwood's ruckman, Damian Monkhorst.

The AFL arranged a mediation session between Long and Monkhorst, and, although Long was clearly unsatisfied by the short-term outcome of this meeting, the long-term result was that it set a precedent; consequently, since this incident, there have only been four widely publicised accusations of racial taunts by a player on the AFL field in the proceeding 27 years.

For the next two seasons, Long needed knee surgery and only took the field seven times. He missed the first half of 1998 recovering from the surgery but finished the year strongly, playing in nine games.

According to the Round 3 AFL Record of 1999, between the beginning of the 1994 and end of the 1998 seasons, Long played only 38 of a possible 119 games.

Long is renowned for his sharp wit. In an incident recalled by Long's coach, Kevin Sheedy, there was a fundraiser to reconstruct Windy Hill that was underway, and Sheedy was conducting a serious training session in front of a whiteboard and 200 people, mostly money donors. He paused to ask if anyone had a question. To the surprise of all that knew him, Long, who apparently hadn't spoken up during a training session in five years, raised his hand, causing people to fall silent to hear Long speak. Long asked, "What was wrong with the blackboard?"

Long had the honour of kicking the first-ever goal at the new Docklands Stadium when it opened in 2000. He was also a member of Essendon's record-breaking premiership team in 2000 which saw only one loss for the entire season. Long faced heavy scrutiny for his bump on Troy Simmonds, which rendered Simmonds unconscious and raised the possibility of him losing mobility, which thankfully never eventuated. However, this incident inspired the AFL to introduce new rules protecting players with their heads over the ball. Long was suspended for this incident.

2001 was Long's final season, and although Essendon made the Grand Final that year, Long aggravated a hamstring during Grand Final training and was forced to name himself unavailable on the eve of the game, which Essendon lost to Brisbane.

Playing statistics

|- style="background-color: #EAEAEA"
! scope="row" style="text-align:center" | 1989
|style="text-align:center;"|
| 4 || 24 || 19 || 10 || 233 || 203 || 436 || 68 || 63 || 0.8 || 0.4 || 9.7 || 8.5 || 18.2 || 2.8 || 2.6 || 8
|-
! scope="row" style="text-align:center" | 1990
|style="text-align:center;"|
| 4 || 25 || 13 || 9 || 221 || 184 || 405 || 58 || 51 || 0.5 || 0.4 || 8.8 || 7.4 || 16.2 || 2.3 || 2.0 || 5
|- style="background:#eaeaea;"
! scope="row" style="text-align:center" | 1991
|style="text-align:center;"|
| 13 || 18 || 13 || 6 || 170 || 132 || 302 || 26 || 34 || 0.7 || 0.3 || 9.4 || 7.3 || 16.8 || 1.4 || 1.9 || 6
|-
! scope="row" style="text-align:center" | 1992
|style="text-align:center;"|
| 13 || 17 || 13 || 8 || 182 || 157 || 339 || 56 || 34 || 0.8 || 0.5 || 10.7 || 9.2 || 19.9 || 3.3 || 2.0 || 7
|- style="background:#eaeaea;"
| scope=row bgcolor=F0E68C | 1993# || 
| 13 || 18 || 12 || 4 || 228 || 188 || 416 || 72 || 40 || 0.7 || 0.2 || 12.7 || 10.4 || 23.1 || 4.0 || 2.2 || 1
|-
! scope="row" style="text-align:center" | 1994
|style="text-align:center;"|
| 13 || 0 || — || — || — || — || — || — || — || — || — || — || — || — || — || —
|- style="background:#eaeaea;"
! scope="row" style="text-align:center" | 1995
|style="text-align:center;"|
| 13 || 22 || 27 || 18 || 294 || 221 || 515 || 80 || 40 || 1.2 || 0.8 || 13.4 || 10.0 || 23.4 || 3.6 || 1.8 || 16
|-
! scope="row" style="text-align:center" | 1996
|style="text-align:center;"|
| 13 || 2 || 2 || 0 || 9 || 6 || 15 || 1 || 2 || 1.0 || 0.0 || 4.5 || 3.0 || 7.5 || 0.5 || 1.0 || 0
|- style="background:#eaeaea;"
! scope="row" style="text-align:center" | 1997
|style="text-align:center;"|
| 13 || 5 || 4 || 6 || 37 || 39 || 76 || 19 || 3 || 0.8 || 1.2 || 7.4 || 7.8 || 15.2 || 3.8 || 0.6 || 2
|-
! scope="row" style="text-align:center" | 1998
|style="text-align:center;"|
| 13 || 9 || 9 || 4 || 54 || 60 || 114 || 30 || 9 || 1.0 || 0.4 || 6.0 || 6.7 || 12.7 || 3.3 || 1.0 || 2
|- style="background:#eaeaea;"
! scope="row" style="text-align:center" | 1999
|style="text-align:center;"|
| 13 || 20 || 12 || 12 || 223 || 122 || 345 || 62 || 27 || 0.6 || 0.6 || 11.2 || 6.1 || 17.3 || 3.1 || 1.4 || 9
|-
| scope=row bgcolor=F0E68C | 2000# || 
| 13 || 23 || 18 || 18 || 230 || 135 || 365 || 72 || 59 || 0.8 || 0.8 || 10.0 || 5.9 || 15.9 || 3.1 || 2.6 || 2
|- style="background:#eaeaea;"
! scope="row" style="text-align:center" | 2001
|style="text-align:center;"|
| 13 || 7 || 1 || 4 || 42 || 30 || 72 || 16 || 16 || 0.1 || 0.6 || 6.0 || 4.3 || 10.3 || 2.3 || 2.3 || 0
|- class="sortbottom"
! colspan=3| Career
! 190
! 143
! 99
! 1923
! 1477
! 3400
! 560
! 378
! 0.8
! 0.5
! 10.1
! 7.8
! 17.9
! 2.9
! 2.0
! 58
|}

Honours and achievements
Team
 2× AFL premiership player: 1993, 2000
 6× McClelland Trophy: 1989, 1990, 1993, 1999, 2000, 2001
 2× NTFL premiership player (St Mary's): 1986–1987, 1987–1988

Individual
 Norm Smith Medal: 1993
 Essendon Captain: 1999
 2× All-Australian team: 1988, 1995
 State of Origin (Northern Territory): 1988
 State of Origin (QLD/NT): 1993
 Essendon Team of the Century 1896-1997 – Wing
 Australian Football League Indigenous Team of the Century 1904-2003 – Wing
 Northern Territory Team of the Century – Wing
 Australian Football Hall of Fame - 2007 Inductee
 West Torrens Football Club – Best & Fairest: 1988

Post-football 

Following his retirement, Long became a spokesman for Indigenous Australians. He was a critic of then-Prime Minister John Howard's policies towards Indigenous Australians—most notably Howard's refusal to make an apology to the Stolen Generation. In a letter published in Melbourne's The Age, Long likened Howard to "those cold-hearted pricks" who stole his parents.

His political activities culminated in a protest march from Melbourne to Canberra, leaving on 21 November 2004. The aim of the walk was to obtain a meeting with the Prime Minister. After ten days of intense media scrutiny of the walk, the Prime Minister eventually granted Long a meeting, at which point Long called an end to the walk, having completed about 325 km of the planned 650 km walk. He later said: "I wanted to make a change. It was about challenging the government about some of the issues Aboriginal people were facing and still face – education, employment, health, housing, the Stolen Generations." The walk became known as The Long Walk, and the tradition of a commemorative community walk in Melbourne has continued, with thousands turning out for the event. The walk takes places in late May or early June before the Dreamtime game, starting at Federation Square and ending at the MCG. Long is patron of The Long Walk, an organisation inspired by his walk and which works for the health and well-being of Indigenous Australians.

In 2006, he was charged with assaulting a man at a football club function in Darwin. He pleaded guilty when the case came to trial in 2009, saying that he had struck a man who had attacked his sister. No conviction was recorded, with the magistrate saying that he was unlikely to re-offend.

In July 2011, Long signed up as ambassador for weight-loss agency Jenny Craig, partly to highlight indigenous health. Weighing 112 kg, 30 kg more than his playing weight, his aim was to drop at least 10 kg in around 10 weeks.

In 2015, he became board member of the newly founded Michael Long Foundation (MLF), and in 2016 the Michael Long Learning and Leadership Centre (MLLLC) opened in Darwin. MLF funds education and football programs for indigenous people, and the MLLLC, funded by the federal government and managed by the Australian Football League Northern Territory (AFLNT), aims to nurture talent and improve lives and communities.

In 2018, he was treated for a life-threatening infectious disease, melioidosis, in a hospital in Darwin; however, this did not stop him from announcing plans for a second Long Walk, as he was honoured for the Sir Doug Nicholls round at Dreamtime at the 'G in May 2019.

Long was awarded the Medal of the Order of Australia in the 2021 Queen's Birthday Honours, for "service to Australian rules football, and to the Indigenous community".

Champions of Essendon 
In 2002, an Essendon panel ranked him at 23 in their Champions of Essendon list of the 25 greatest players ever to have played for Essendon.

Notes

References 

Main, Jim. The Big Aussie Rules Book, Bombers have too Long to wait, Rugby Press Limited 1994 page 67
Hobbs, Greg. AFL Record, A mighty Long performance to offset a captain's pain, Australian Football League, Progress Printers & Distributors, Round 3 1999, page 61
Football Record, AFL Grand Final Football Record, 1993
Main, Jim. & Christison, Darren, 1989 Football The Year in Review, Century Magazines 1989
The 90's: The Decade that Delivered (video/DVD)
The Long Walk – History
Give us some hope Source: The Age 4 December 2004

External links 
 

1969 births
Living people
Australian rules footballers from the Northern Territory
Essendon Football Club players
Essendon Football Club Premiership players
Champions of Essendon
Norm Smith Medal winners
Recipients of the Medal of the Order of Australia
West Torrens Football Club players
All-Australians (AFL)
Indigenous Australian players of Australian rules football
St Mary's Football Club (NTFL) players
Tiwi Islands people
Australian Football Hall of Fame inductees
Rioli family
Two-time VFL/AFL Premiership players